Transformers: Beast Wars is an entertainment franchise from Hasbro, and is part of the larger Transformers franchise. The franchise directly follows the Transformers: Generation 1 continuity established by the 1984 series and animated film. It ignores the continuity established by the Japanese Transformers series, though this franchise would have two exclusive Japanese series of its own. Previous to Beast Wars, Hasbro had attempted to relaunch the original toys and animation as Transformers: Generation 2. Hasbro intended another franchise titled Transtech to follow, combining Beast Wars and Generation 1 characters and aesthetics, but this was cancelled. Instead the franchise began a series of reboots, beginning with the Japanese-produced Transformers: Car Robot series, internationally known as Transformers: Robots in Disguise.

Beast Machines
Beast Wars was succeeded by Beast Machines, a new series with a new creative team in charge of production. The Maximals find themselves back on Cybertron, malfunctioning and trapped in their first beast modes (the ones they had at the beginning of Beast Wars). They were without memory of what happened previously, and fighting for survival against mindless drones called Vehicons. These were created and controlled by Megatron. With the whole planet empty, and all of the Transformers missing, Optimus Primal, Cheetor, Rattrap, and Blackarachnia begin a new crusade, this time to free the entire planet.

Beast Wars in Japan
The Japanese series Beast Wars II and Beast Wars Neo were created to fill the gap while the second and third seasons of Beast Wars were being translated into Japanese (called Beast Wars: Metals). The characters originate from the future that the Beast Wars teams left, but the events of the series take place in the far future. The series saw the return of Unicron. Unlike the original Beast Wars series, Beast Wars II and Beast Wars Neo used traditional animation and were aimed at a much younger audience. Beast Wars II spawned a theatrical movie. The Beast Wars Neo toyline was created to cater to the Japanese market. Whereas the cybernetic transmetal Beast Wars Transformers sold well in Western markets, Japanese fans preferred more realistic looking beast modes; thus, Beast Wars Metals was not as successful with Japanese fans. The second and third season of Beast Wars and its toy line only lasted a few months before being replaced by Transformers: Car Robots in the following new year, in which several unused Transmetal 2 molds were used as Destrongers (Predacons). Beast Machines was also imported to Japan in 2004 under the title Beast Wars Returns, though it did not gain very much popularity.

Comic books

Officially, the Beast Wars and Beast Machines series exist as the future of Generation 1 universe, and not specifically the original cartoon series or Marvel Comics series. The writers of the series adopted this position in order to pick and choose the best elements of the discrete Generation 1 continuities.

BotCon comics
In the BotCon comics, two particular Beast Wars storylines are tapped.

In the Omega Point storyline, several events lead up to a tremendous battle against Shokaract, a Predacon fueled by the Dark Essence of Unicron himself. This also serves as an introduction for Apelinq, and the only appearances of Windrazor, Sandstorm, Antagony, and Cataclysm.

In the Primeval Dawn story, Tarantulas comes back from the dead alongside Ravage, Spittor, Iguanus, and Razorclaw to complete the mission he set out to do, while the Vok create Primal Prime to stand in his way; Primal Prime teams up with Airazor, Tigatron, and Ramulus, who have come back from the dead as well.

Dreamwave Productions
Dreamwave Productions released a Summer Special which contained a Beast Wars story. It introduced three new characters, Optimus Minor, Bonecrusher, and Wolfang. The comic had a survey as to whether Dreamwave's new comic would be Robots In Disguise or Beast Wars. Beast Wars won.

Dreamwave Productions had plans to release a Beast Wars comic in early 2005, which would have been done by the War Within creative team of Simon Furman and Don Figueroa. Brad Mick and Adam Patyk were originally planned to write the series until they left Dreamwave after not being paid for several projects. However, although some cover art did appear on the internet, Dreamwave entered bankruptcy before one issue could be published.

IDW Publishing

A mini-series takes place parallel to the third season of Beast Wars and introduces characters who are not shown in the original series such as Magmatron, Razorbeast, and Injector. Other characters who appear are Grimlock in his Beast Wars body (a recolored Dinobot toy) and Ravage in his Transmetal II "Tripredacus Agent" incarnation.

The mini-series focuses on Magmatron, sent by the Tripredacus Council to capture Megatron after Ravage's failure. However, Magmatron has his own agenda - to create his own army from the stasis pods the Axalon ejected in the pilot episode of Beast Wars. His scheme is partially thwarted by the Maximal double-agent Razorbeast, who ensures the shell program used reconfigures many of the protoforms as Maximals rather than Predacons. The two sides clash in an attempt to stop Magmatron from returning to Cybertron with a captured Megatron, with some unexpected aid from Grimlock ensuring Magmatron is sent back to Cybertron empty handed. However, Razorbeast's Maximals and many Predacons (led by Ravage, resurrected in a Transmetal II body) are left on Earth, opening the way for future series.

Video games
There have been two Beast Wars video games. The first game, simply called Beast Wars, was released for the PlayStation and PC. It is a third-person shooter, based on the first season of the show, in which players control either the Maximals or the Predacons in a series of missions to undermine the other faction's attempts at gaining enough resources to win the war between them and escape the planet. It was given a multiplayer feature (removed from the console releases) that allowed up to 8 players to play over LAN, with its own play rooms in the MS Gaming Zone (they have since been removed). The second game, Transformers: Beast Wars Transmetals, is a fighting game based on the second season. The PlayStation version was released by Hasbro Interactive and the Nintendo 64 version was released by bam! Entertainment. Most of the cast members from the show reprised their roles. A third game was in the works for the PlayStation 2, but was scrapped in pre-production, without any official word as to why, or how far the project was before the plug was pulled.

See also
List of Beast Wars characters

Video games
Beast Wars: Transformers
Transformers: Beast Wars Transmetals
Kettō Transformers Beast Wars: Beast Senshi Saikyō Ketteisen

Television series
 Beast Wars: Transformers
List of Beast Wars episodes
 Beast Machines
List of Beast Machines episodes
 Beast Wars II
Beast Wars II: Lio Convoy, Close Call!
List of Beast Wars II characters
 Beast Wars Neo
List of Beast Wars Neo characters
 Beast Wars Sourcebook

Film
 Transformers: Rise of the Beasts

References

 
Transformers (toy line)